Hollywood Professional School was a private school in Hollywood, California. Initially established as a music conservatory by pianist Gladys T. Littell in 1921 under the name Hollywood Conservatory of Music and Arts, the school quickly expanded its offerings into theater and dance as well as music. In 1929 the Hollywood Professional School (HPS) was established by Viola Foss Lawler as a companion private school to the conservatory, with both schools operating legally as a single institution under the Hollywood Conservatory of Music and Arts name. In 1944 the school was purchased by Bertha Keller Mann and it ceased teaching the arts and became solely a private school teaching traditional academic subjects in grades K-12 to mostly children working in the entertainment business or competitive athletics in Los Angeles. Many famous individuals attended the school including John Drew Barrymore, Gloria DeHaven, Annette Funicello, Judy Garland, Betty Grable, Melanie Griffith, Val Kilmer, Peggy Lipton, Ann Miller, Mickey Rooney, and Natalie WoodJill Banner Actress Alene Rae(Maiman)Dancer,Pianist

History
The Hollywood Professional School (HPS) was established in 1921 by pianist Gladys T. Littell under the name the Hollywood Conservatory of Music and Arts (HCMA). The HCMA taught both children in a pre-professional program and young adults on a pre-professional conservatory track of development. Originally the school only offered instruction in string instruments, piano, and vocal music, with instruction in singing initially being led by Louis Graveure, and Frances Kendig teaching piano and music theory, and string instruction by Zoellner.  For the Fall of 1924, bandmaster, clarinetist, and composer Albert Perfect joined the faculty of the school when it expanded its offering to include woodwinds and brass instruments. At the same time Modest Altschuler was a visiting lecturer at the institution, and Russian pianist Alexander Kosloff joined the piano faculty. Soon after, Bruno David Ussher was hired to teach music history for the school, Arthur Kachel was hired to teach acting in the tradition of Leland T. Powers, Roy Harris was hired as an instructor in ear training, and Jean Galeron taught French and diction for singers.

Several important appointments were made in December 1924 for the beginning of the Spring 1925 academic semester, including the appointment of the HCMA's first official administrative director, its founder Gladys T. Littell. Hugo Kirchhofer was appointed as the head of the vocal music department, and Lizeta Kalova taking over the strings department. In 1925 the HCMA moved into new premises at 5400 Hollywood Boulevard at Serrano Avenue with a recital on November 17, 1925. Opera singer Alma Stetzler taught singing at the school in the late 1920s. German concert pianist and composer Georg Liebling was a member of the piano faculty in the early 1930s. The school presented numerous student recitals and productions during the 1920s and early 1930s, as well as hosting concerts given by established professionals. During the late 1930s and early 1940s the conservatory portion of school reduced steadily.

In 1929 Viola Foss Lawler established the Hollywood Professional School (HPS) at 5402 Hollywood Boulevard as a private school addition to the HCMA. This allowed students at the conservatory to attend grammar school and secondary school classes while studying subjects like music and drama. Lawler's school focused on catering to children in the entertainment business, following a similar model pioneered by the Professional Children's School in New York City. By 1930 there were close to 300 students enrolled in the first through 12th grades at HPS. Lawler parted ways with the HCMA in 1937 to establish her own independent school, the Lawler Professional School which was later known as the Mar-Ken School. The HPS continued to operate at the HCMA under Littell. 
 
In 1944 Littell sold the HCMA to Bertha Keller Mann and it ceased teaching the arts. The HPS private school became the sole focus of the institution. In 1948 the school was enrolling students K-12 and operating under the name the Hollywood Professional School while legally still existing under its former name, the Hollywood Conservatory of Music and Arts, on paper. Many of the pupils who attended the school were children working in show business, operating mornings only so that the children could work in the afternoon. It closed down in June 1985 due to insufficient enrollment and the death of the owner that same year. The school's building and many of its assets were auctioned in August 1985.

Notable alumni

 Beverly Aadland, actress
 Dick Addrisi of "The Addrisi Brothers"
 Donna Atwood, figure skater
 John Drew Barrymore, actor
 Molly Bee, singer
 Valerie Bertinelli, actress
 Barbara Bouchet, actress
 Jimmy Boyd, actor, singer
 Todd Bridges, actor
 Lonnie Burr, actor, dancer 
 Tony Butala, singer (member of The Lettermen)
 John Hope Bryant, entrepreneur and actor
 Charles L. Campbell, sound editor
 Roger Campbell, ice skater and Olympic medalist
 Jo Ann Castle, pianist
 Cyd Charisse, dancer and actress
 Tommy Cole, actor, makeup artist
 Larry Collins, singer
 Lorrie Collins, singer
 The Cowsills, singing group
 Martha Crawford Cantarini, actress
 Joan Davis, actress, comedian
 Gloria DeHaven, actress
 Bobby Driscoll, actor
 Edith Fellows, actress
 Peggy Fleming, Olympic figure skater, television sports commentator
 Annette Funicello, actress
 Judy Garland, singer, actress
 Leif Garrett, actor, singer
 John Gary, singer
 Lisa Gaye, actress
 Wally George, talk-show host
 Barry Gordon, actor, former Screen Actors Guild President
Peter Gowland, photographer
 Betty Grable, actress, singer, dancer
Urbie Green, trombonist
 Melanie Griffith, actress
 Arthur Hamilton, song writer
 Sherry Jackson, actress
 Larry Kert, actor, singer
 Val Kilmer, actor
 Tommy Kirk, actor
 Christopher Knight, actor (The Brady Bunch)
 Marta Kristen, actress
 Piper Laurie, actress
 Brenda Lee, singer
 Roberta Linn, singer
 Peggy Lipton, actress
 Michael Lloyd, musician, producer, screen composer
 Julie London, actress, singer
 Mike Lookinland, actor (The Brady Bunch)
 Skip E. Lowe, actor  
 Susan Luckey, actress
 Sue Lyon, actress
 Eddy Medora, guitarist (member of The Sunrays)
 David Marks guitarist, singer (member of The Beach Boys
 Maureen McCormick, actress (The Brady Bunch)
 Ann Miller, actress, dancer, singer
 Shirley Mills, actress
 Yvette Mimieux, actress
 Marrian Murray, Canadian figure skating champion
 Donald O'Connor, actor, dancer
 Susan Olsen, actress (The Brady Bunch)
 Cubby O'Brien, actor, drummer
 Griffin O'Neal, actor
 Ryan O'Neal, actor
 Tatum O'Neal, actress
 Annette O'Toole, actress
 Debra Paget, actress
 Butch Patrick, actor
 Melody Patterson, actress
 Mackenzie Phillips, actress
 Tommy Rall, dancer
 Angel Romero, guitarist
 Mickey Rooney, actor
 Peggy Ryan, actress, dancer
Lugene Sanders, actress
 Jill St. John, actress
 Karen Sharpe, actress
 The Steiner Brothers (tap-dancing trio)
 Connie Stevens, actress
 Matthew Ward, singer
 Tone Loc, rapper
 Tuesday Weld, actress
 Virginia Weidler, actress
 Andy Williams, singer
 Carl Wilson, singer, guitarist (member of The Beach Boys)
 Lana Wood, actress
 Natalie Wood, actress

References

External links
 HPS Alumni Association
 Reed v. Hollywood Professional School (1959) Anti-discrimination lawsuit against the school by a black child denied admission.

Defunct schools in California
Educational institutions established in 1921
Private K-12 schools in Los Angeles County, California
Educational institutions disestablished in 1985
1922 establishments in California
Music schools in California